RGK may refer to:

RGK Foundation
RGK Mobile
RGK Center for Philanthropy and Community Service
RGK color space, see RG color space
Red Wing Regional Airport (FAA Code: RGK)
Gorno-Altaysk Airport (IATA Code: RGK)
Romano-Germanic Commission (Römisch-Germanische Kommission), a department of the German Archaeological Institute
RGK Entertainment Group
RGK Records
RGK Wheelchairs